Pál Rajner (28 February 1823 – 9 September 1879) was a Hungarian politician, who served as Interior Minister between 1869 and 1871. He took part in the Hungarian Revolution of 1848. Count Gyula Andrássy appointed him as Interior Minister. In 1871 Rajner resigned because of his neurological disorders. Later he committed suicide.

References
 A Pallas Nagy Lexikona 
 Magyar Életrajzi Lexikon 

1823 births
1879 deaths
People from Pest, Hungary
Hungarian people of German descent
Hungarian politicians who committed suicide
Suicides in Hungary
Hungarian Interior Ministers